The Smith & Wesson Model 52, sometimes referred to as the 38 Master, is a semi-automatic pistol developed by Smith & Wesson for Bullseye shooting.  It was one of the first semiautomatic pistols chambered in .38 Special with flush-seated, full wadcutter bullets. The shape of the rimmed cartridge limited the magazine capacity to five rounds. A variant, known as the Model 952, in 9 mm Parabellum, is still produced in limited quantities by Smith & Wesson's Performance Center. The Model 52 was discontinued in 1993 when the machinery to manufacture the pistol broke down and it was deemed too costly to replace.

History
In 1961 Smith & Wesson Model introduced the Model 52 as a match-grade target pistol derived from the Smith & Wesson Model 39.  It was chambered in .38 Special Wadcutter for the sport of Bullseye shooting.

The first version, known simply as the Model 52, retained the basic trigger mechanism of the Model 39, with the Double-Action function selectable via a simple frame-mounted setscrew, allowing the pistol to be fired in either single-action or double-action mode depending on the setscrew's adjustment.

In 1963 the Model 52-1 was introduced with a separately developed single-action trigger system and was manufactured until 1970, when it was succeeded by the Model 52-2. Changes to the 52-2 included an improved extractor and this version was manufactured for 23 years.

By 1992, the 30-year-old machinery used to make the Model 52 was showing signs of age and was starting to fail. Smith & Wesson decided against replacing it and the handgun was discontinued. The last model 52-2 was completed on July 23, 1993. The pistol's serial number was “TZW9149” and it was delivered to the company's private gun vault as an archive piece.

Model 952 

The Smith & Wesson Model 952 was introduced in 2000 as a Performance Center pistol based on the Model 52 but chambered in 9mm. Enhancements included a 5” match-grade barrel, titanium-coated spherical barrel bushing, 9-round magazine, loaded chamber indicator and a slide-mounted decocking lever. An enhanced version was produced in 2004 and a long slide variant with a 6" barrel debuted in 2006.

References

Smith & Wesson semi-automatic pistols